Spur 371 is a  limited-access spur route in the U.S. state of Texas in San Antonio. Spur 371 follows General Hudnell Drive from the former Kelly Air Force Base to U.S. Highway 90 (US 90) southwest of Downtown San Antonio. The highway provides access to the Kelly USA industrial park.

Route description

Spur 371 begins at Billy Mitchell Boulevard at the former boundary of Kelly Air Force Base and heads towards the northeast as a limited-access highway. The highway's northern terminus at US 90 only facilitates traffic from northbound Spur 371 to eastbound US 90 and from westbound US 90 to southbound Spur 371.

History
Spur 371 was designated on September 25, 1962, to provide access to Kelly Field from US 90 on the southwest side of San Antonio.

The highway is named after Major General William Thomas Hudnell (1908–1986), who served as commander of the San Antonio Air Materiel Area (later the San Antonio Air Logistics Center) at the former Kelly Air Force Base, from 1960 to 1965.

Exit list

See also

References

371
Transportation in San Antonio
Freeways in Texas
Transportation in Bexar County, Texas